Ana Elisa Martínez (born 18 March 1975 in Buenos Aires, Argentina) popularly known as Anita Martínez is an Argentine actress, comedian, dancer, and television host.

She has won two Martín Fierro Awards for her comedian work in en Noche de Ronda, Showmatch, and Animales Sueltos. She has also received a Vos Award for her work in theatre.

Biography 
She started studying classical dance. Later, she decided to study musical theatre. She got her first job on television after being selected to host for the Argentine sports channel TyC Sports.

After going through several jobs, a producer convinced her to study acting:

At the end of 1996, she presented the children's television program Todo bien with Marcelo Mingochea on Channel 13.

In 1997, she made her theatrical debut with the play Pijamas, which she continued to perform until 1999. During the 2000 theatrical season, she performed in El Show de las Divorciadas. 
Between 2004 and 2005 she acted in the comedy series Panadería Los Felipe. In 2005, she participated in the comedy program Vale la pena, along with Fabián Gianola. In cinema, she participated in Apasionados and in El cine de Mailte. For several years, she advertised the Harpic toilet bowl cleaner.

In 2008, she performed in the stage play Planeta Show, alongside the renowned Argentine humorist Jorge Ginzburg.

In 2013, she starred in her one-woman show, De Vuelta al Barrio.

She was also a part of the reality television Bailando por un Sueño in 2014, which was broadcast on Showmatch. Martinez and fellow comedian Marcos Bicho Gómez became the leading competitors with 59.42% of the public vote. Martinez won second place against Ximena Capristo after four months of competition. She returned to the competition after Cecilia Oviedo resigned, after she suffered severe injuries while rehearsing two weeks into the contest. In 2016, she competed again with Gómez in Bailando por un Sueño and won fourteenth place after five months of competition.

At the end of 2016, she participated in Flavio Mendoza's work Mahatma alongside Facundo Mazzei, Barbie Franco, and the Spanish rock band, Iceberg del Sur.

Theater

Television

Movies

Radio

Awards and nominations

References

1975 births
Living people
Argentine actresses
Participants in Argentine reality television series
Bailando por un Sueño (Argentine TV series) participants
Bailando por un Sueño (Argentine TV series) winners